Fajardo Futbol Club (Fajardo FC) is an association football team from Fajardo, Puerto Rico which competed in the Supercopa DirecTV 2010 qualifying tournament (in place of the 2010 Puerto Rico Soccer League season).

2010 squad

See also 
 Puerto Rico Soccer League
 Supercopa DirecTV 2010

References 

Association football clubs established in 2010
Football clubs in Puerto Rico
Puerto Rico Soccer League teams
2010 establishments in Puerto Rico